Destiny's Child World Tour is a DVD by R&B group Destiny's Child. The video was filmed during their show at Rotterdam, the Netherlands.

Content
This full concert showcases songs from their self-titled debut album Destiny's Child, as well as The Writing's on the Wall, and Survivor.

Reception
Destiny's Child World Tour was certified gold by the British Phonographic Industry on July 22, 2013, for shipping 25,000 copies.

Track listing
 "Program Start" – 1:48
 "Independent Women Part I" – 3:31
 "No, No, No Part 2" – 2:43
 "Bug a Boo" – 2:30
 "Bills, Bills, Bills" – 3:30
 "Get on the Bus" – 3:23
 "Nasty Girl" – 3:10
 "Emotion" – 4:01
 "Ooh Child" – 2:26
 "Heard A Word" – 4:04
 "Dangerously in Love" – 6:21
 "Gospel Medley" – 3:51
 "Bootylicious" – 3:16
 "Say My Name" – 4:16
 "Work It Out" – 3:34
 "Proud Mary" – 1:26
 "Jumpin', Jumpin'"/Band Break – 7:45
 "Survivor" – 4:01
 "Happy Face" – 5:13

Bonus Videos
 "Feelin' You" (Part II) – Solange Knowles – 4:04
 "Stole" – Kelly Rowland – 4:18
 "Heard A Word" – Michelle Williams – 3:43

Other Features
 Discography

Charts

Weekly charts

Year-end charts

Certifications

Release history

References

amazon.com

Destiny's Child video albums
2003 live albums
2003 video albums
Live video albums